The 2012–13 SMU Mustangs men's basketball team represented Southern Methodist University during the 2012–13 NCAA Division I men's basketball season. The Mustangs, led by first year head coach Larry Brown, played their home games at the Moody Coliseum and were members of Conference USA. They finished the season 15–17, 5–11 in C-USA play to finish in eleventh place. They lost in the first round of the Conference USA tournament to UAB.

This was the Mustangs last season as a member of C-USA as they joined the American Athletic Conference in July 2013.

Roster

Schedule

|-
!colspan=9| Non-Conference Regular Season

|-
!colspan=9| Conference Regular Season

|-
!colspan=9| 2013 Conference USA men's basketball tournament

References

SMU Mustangs men's basketball seasons
SMU